Marek Kvapil (born 5 January 1985) is a Czech professional ice hockey player who is currently playing for HC Sparta Praha of the Czech Extraliga (ELH). He has won the Gagarin Cup twice with Dynamo in 2012 and 2013. Although born in the Slovak city of Ilava, Kvapil has represented the Czech Republic in various international competitions.

Playing career
After training in HC Slavia Praha's development program, Kvapil moved to North America after being drafted by the Saginaw Spirit in the first round (11th overall) of the 2004 CHL Import Draft. He was drafted the following year by the Tampa Bay Lightning, though would never play for the team. After spending three years in their farm system, Kvapil returned to Europe in 2008 to continue his career.

On 7 April 2017, Kvapil agreed to return to the KHL in signing a one-year contract as a free agent with Amur Khabarovsk. In the 2017–18 season, Kvapil contributed with just 1 goal in 11 games before ending his brief stint with Amur in returning to the Czech Extraliga with HC Bílí Tygři Liberec on a three-year contract on 10 November 2017.

Career statistics

Regular season and playoffs

International

References

External links

1985 births
Amur Khabarovsk players
HC Bílí Tygři Liberec players
Czech ice hockey right wingers
HC Dynamo Moscow players
Fort Wayne Komets players
Johnstown Chiefs players
KHL Medveščak Zagreb players
HC Kometa Brno players
Living people
Mississippi Sea Wolves players
HC Neftekhimik Nizhnekamsk players
Norfolk Admirals players
People from Ilava
Sportspeople from the Trenčín Region
Saginaw Spirit players
Severstal Cherepovets players
HC Slavia Praha players
Springfield Falcons players
Tampa Bay Lightning draft picks
HC Vítkovice players
Czech expatriate ice hockey players in Russia
Czech expatriate sportspeople in Croatia
Czech expatriate ice hockey players in the United States
Expatriate ice hockey players in Croatia